Shin Young-chul (born ) is a former South Korean male volleyball player. He was part of the South Korea men's national volleyball team at the 1992 Summer Olympics and the 1996 Summer Olympics.1992 Summer Olympics He played for Kepco.

Clubs
 Armi (1990)
 Kepco (1994)

References

1964 births
Living people
South Korean men's volleyball players
Sportspeople from North Gyeongsang Province
Olympic volleyball players of South Korea
Volleyball players at the 1992 Summer Olympics
Volleyball players at the 1996 Summer Olympics
Asian Games medalists in volleyball
Asian Games silver medalists for South Korea
Asian Games bronze medalists for South Korea
Volleyball players at the 1990 Asian Games
Volleyball players at the 1994 Asian Games
Medalists at the 1990 Asian Games
Medalists at the 1994 Asian Games
Kyonggi University alumni
20th-century South Korean people